This page lists the World Best Year Performance in the year 1998 in the men's decathlon. One of the main events during this season were the 1998 European Championships in Budapest, Hungary, where the competition started on August 18, 1998, and ended on August 19, 1998.

Records

1998 World Year Ranking

See also
1998 Hypo-Meeting

References
decathlon2000
apulanta
IAAF Year Ranking
digilander

1998
Decathlon Year Ranking, 1998